This is a list of Cambodian flags:

National flag

Royal standard

Military flags

Government flags

Sporting flags

Religious flags

Political  flags

Historical flags

National flag proposals

References

External links
National flags and anthems of Cambodia

Flags of Cambodia
Flags